Aqa Baba-ye Faramarzi (also Romanized as Āqā Bābā-ye Farāmarzī and Āqā Bābā-ye Frāmarzī) is a village in Sina Rural District, in the Central District of Varzaqan County, East Azerbaijan Province, Iran. At the year 2006 census, its population was 221, in 56 families.

References 

Towns and villages in Varzaqan County